DAZN Group Limited (formerly Perform Group) is a British sports media company owned by Access Industries.

Its flagship property is DAZN, a global sports subscription streaming platform. It also owns a significant minority stake in the leading football portal Goal after TPG's Integrated Media Company (IMC) acquired a majority stake in 2020.

Perform Group was originally formed in 2007 via the merger of Premium TV Limited and Inform Group. It was originally involved in content distribution, subscription, advertising and sponsorship, and technology and production. In 2018, the business-to-business units of Perform Group were spun out as Perform Content, and later sold to Vista Equity Partners and merged into its own sports data company STATS.

History

Perform Group was created in 2007 through the merger of Premium TV Limited, an event sport broadcasting network, and the Inform Group, a digital sports rights agency.

In February 2011, Perform acquired Goal.com. In 2011 and 2013 the company bought sports data companies RunningBall and Opta Sports respectively.

In 2013, Perform Group combined its U.S. businesses with The Sporting News to form Sporting News Media, in which it took a 65% stake. Sporting News' former owner American City Business Journals retained 35%.

Perform Group was de-listed from the London Stock Exchange in November 2014 when Access Industries increased its stake in the company from 42.5% to 77%.

In December 2014 Perform and the WTA announced a 10-year media deal, under which they would jointly form WTA Media to manage and distribute its media rights. In February 2016, Perform Group and the FIBA announced a partnership to distribute and sell broadcasting rights to its basketball competitions.

DAZN, split 

In August 2016, Perform Group launched the online sports video streaming service DAZN, described by media as being a "Netflix for sport".

On 8 May 2018, former ESPN president John Skipper was named executive chairman of Perform Group. He operated out of New York City.

In September 2018, Perform Group was split into two companies; DAZN Group (named after its streaming service) for its consumer content operations, and Perform Content for its business-to-business services. It was reported that this was in preparation for a potential sale of the latter in order to help fund the DAZN operations. In April 2019, it was announced that Perform Content would be sold to Vista Equity Partners. It was subsequently merged into STATS LLC to form Stats Perform.

In March 2019, DAZN re-organized the Perform Media division into DAZN Media. It handles advertising and sponsorship sales for DAZN's global operations, including the "DAZN+" program (which coordinates "personalised communications" between its partners and subscribers), and DAZN Player (formerly ePlayer), the group's syndicated video content service.

In May 2020, the Financial Times reported that DAZN was seeking further investments in order to secure the future of the business, which had been affected by the COVID-19 pandemic. In October 2020, it reached a deal to sell stakes in Goal, Spox, VoetbalZone to Integrated Media Company (IMC), a portfolio of TPG Capital, and in December 2020 it sold Sporting News to PAX Holdings.

References

External links

British companies established in 2007
2007 in London
2007 establishments in England
Companies based in London
Sports mass media in the United Kingdom
Data companies